Zhangshu East railway station is a railway station in Zhangshu, Yichun, Jiangxi, China. It is an intermediate stop on both the Beijing–Kowloon railway and the Nanchang–Ganzhou high-speed railway. It was opened in 1996. On 26 December 2019, high-speed services began calling at the station.

References 

Railway stations in Jiangxi
Railway stations in China opened in 1996